Mary Rider (sometimes credited as Mary Rider Mechtold) was an American screenwriter, playwright, and short story writer active primarily during the 1910s.

Biography 
Mary was born in Illinois to judge George Rider and his wife, Elizabeth Prettyman, in Pekin, Illinois. Later on, she attended the Chicago University.  

She began to write plays as well as short stories during the 1910s that appeared in publications like Sunset, Metropolitan, and Munsey's Magazine. She also wrote for vaudeville before writing stories for the screen during Hollywood's silent era. One of her earliest stories to hit the screen was 1914's The Mountain Rat. Over the next few years, she would go on to write a dozen or so shorts and features. 

She married Reuben Maynard in New York City in 1916. The couple had no children.

Selected filmography 

 Sunshine Alley (1917)
 Behind the Lines (1916)
 The Snowbird (1916)
 Gladiola (1915)
 The Way Back (1915)
 The Mountain Girl (1915) (short)
 Indiscretion (1915) (short)
 At the Stroke of the Angelus (1915) (short)
 Killed Against Orders (1915) (short)
 Ashes of the Past (1914) (short)
 The Temple of Moloch (1914) (short)
 The Old Derelict (1914) (short)
 The Mountain Rat (1914) (short)

References 

American screenwriters
Year of death missing
American women screenwriters

Screenwriters from Illinois
1876 births
People from Pekin, Illinois